is a railway station in Kita-ku, Hamamatsu,  Shizuoka Prefecture, Japan, operated by the third sector Tenryū Hamanako Railroad.

Lines
Nishi-Kiga Station is served by the Tenryū Hamanako Line, and is located 47.7 kilometers from the starting point of the line at Kakegawa Station.

Station layout
The station has opposing island platforms joined by a level crossing within the station. The adjacent wooden station building is unmanned, also contains a restaurant. The station building, and waiting room on the platform are protected as Registered Tangible Cultural Properties of Japan since 2011.

Adjacent stations

|-
!colspan=5|Tenryū Hamanako Railroad

Station history
Nishi-Kiga Station was established on April 1, 1938 as a station of the Japan National Railways Futamata Line. Scheduled freight services were discontinued from June 1970. After the privatization of JNR on March 15, 1987, the station came under the control of the Tenryū Hamanako Line.

Passenger statistics
In fiscal 2016, the station was used by an average of 38 passengers daily (boarding passengers only).

Surrounding area
Lake Hamana
Japan National Route 362

See also
 List of Railway Stations in Japan

References

External links

  Tenryū Hamanako Railroad Station information 
 

Railway stations in Shizuoka Prefecture
Railway stations in Japan opened in 1938
Stations of Tenryū Hamanako Railroad
Railway stations in Hamamatsu